American Furniture Warehouse (AFW) is a privately held furniture retailer headquartered in unincorporated Douglas County, Colorado. It was founded in 1975 by entrepreneur Jake Jabs  in a former American Furniture Company store location at 58th Avenue and Bannock in Denver, Colorado.

References

External links

Furniture retailers of the United States
Retail companies established in 1975
1975 establishments in Colorado